Oxycanus subvaria is a moth of the family Hepialidae. It is found in New South Wales, Tasmania and Victoria.

References

Moths described in 1856
Hepialidae
Endemic fauna of Australia